GVI may refer to:

 Gentofte-Vangede Idrætsforening, a Danish football club
 Google Video
 Gulfstream GVI, a business jet